Mahbanoo Tata (born April 26, 1942) is an Indian-born Iranian statistician. She is widely regarded as the founder of statistics in Iran.

Education
A Zoroastrian (Parsi) from Bombay, she attended her local university to obtain her bachelor's and master's degrees before attending Purdue University where she studied and graduated with a Ph.D. in statistics in 1967. After completing her education, she pursued a career in academia, eventually becoming a professor of statistics at several universities in Iran.

Career
She came to Iran after five years of teaching at Michigan State University and spent two years as a statistics professor at Sharif University of Technology. Thereafter, over the course of the following 16 years, she established statistics as a subject at the Institute of Education, Statistics and Informatics, the Higher School of Computer Planning and Application, Iran Azad University, and Allameh Tabatabai University.

In 1989, she moved to Kerman to work in the statistics department of the Department of Mathematics and Computer Science at Shahid Bahonar University of Kerman She oversaw the same department for many years.

Mahbanoo Tata is a member of scientific organisations including the International Institute of Statistics, the Iranian Society of Mathematicians, and the Iranian Society of Statistics. She was named to as "Mother of Statistics of Iran" for all the contributions she made to Iran's statistical expertise.

References 

1942 births
Indian statisticians
20th-century Indian women
Iranian statisticians
Women statisticians
Indian expatriates in the United States
Indian statisticians
Indian women mathematicians
Iranian women scientists
Living people
Parsi people from Mumbai
Scientists from Mumbai
Women statisticians